Paranapiacaba tricincta, the checkered melon beetle, is a species of skeletonizing leaf beetle or flea beetle in the family Chrysomelidae. It is found in Central America and North America.

References

Further reading

External links

 

Galerucinae
Beetles described in 1824
Taxa named by Thomas Say